Luton was a constituency including the town of Luton in Bedfordshire. It returned one Member of Parliament (MP) to the House of Commons of the UK Parliament, elected by the first past the post system 1885–1950 and for 24 years thereafter.

It was created for the 1885 general election as one of two divisions of the county, see Bedfordshire county constituency. The constituency adjoined the seat of Bedford toward the north of the county until 1918.  The seat was equally referred to as Southern Bedfordshire, Bedfordshire Southern and South Bedfordshire until that year.

From the 1910s onwards the town of Luton and contiguous suburbs expanded increasing the electorate as recorded at the census in each decade.  This provoked territory loss to a new seat in 1918 and in 1950 and further population growth (coupled with a programme of new housing principally under the New Towns Act 1946) justified abolition and division into East and West seats in 1974.

Political summary
Before 1950
The seat was Liberal-candidate won for 54 years before 1945, when it was won by the Labour candidate.  The remaining six years were won by Conservative and Unionist Party candidates, running under the emphasis of the party as 'Unionist'.  Until 1918 the seat bore three other official or quasi-official cited names in the House.

After 1955
Charles Hill, Baron Hill of Luton before his life peerage served as a National Liberal and Conservative until 1963 when he died. His party had been re-created again in coalition with the Conservatives in 1931.   The two largest parties won the seat from 1963 until 1974.

Electorate size
The electorate rose through house-building from a relatively modest 37,051 in 1918 to an over-sized (malapportioned) 95,227 in 1945.

In 1950 the electorate of the curtailed seat was 56,569; this rose to 62,457 in 1974, the year when a General Election occurred following an Act of Parliament and abolition-provoking Boundary Commission Report.  The report was the product of the commission's Third Periodic Review of Westminster Seats.

Boundaries and boundary changes
1885–1918: The Sessional Divisions of Luton, Leighton Buzzard, and Woburn, and part of the Sessional Division of Ampthill.

The constituency was created as the Southern or Luton Division of Bedfordshire under the Redistribution of Seats Act 1885, when the two-member Parliamentary County of Bedfordshire was divided into the two single-member constituencies of Biggleswade and Luton.

1918–1950: The Boroughs of Luton and Dunstable, and the Rural District of Luton.

Northern and western parts of the Division, including Leighton Buzzard and surrounding rural areas, were transferred to the new Mid Bedfordshire Division.

1950–1974: The Borough of Luton wards of Central, Crawley, Dallow, High Town, Icknield, Lewsey, South, Stopsley, Sundon Park, and Wardown.

The wards of Leagrave and Limbury, together with the Borough of Dunstable and surrounding rural areas were included in the new constituency of South Bedfordshire. Reclassified as a borough constituency.

For the February 1974 general election the borough constituency of Luton was abolished and was split into two new borough constituencies of Luton East and Luton West.

Members of Parliament

Election results

Elections in the 1880s 

Flower was appointed a Lord Commissioner of the Treasury, requiring a by-election.

Elections in the 1890s 

Flower is elevated to the peerage as Lord Battersea.

Elections in the 1900s

Elections in the 1910s 

General Election 1914–15:

Another General Election was required to take place before the end of 1915. The political parties had been making preparations for an election to take place from 1914 and by the end of this year, the following candidates had been selected; 
Liberal: Cecil Harmsworth 
Unionist: John Owen Hickman

Elections in the 1920s

Elections in the 1930s

Elections in the 1940s 
General Election 1939–40:
Another General Election was required to take place before the end of 1940. The political parties had been making preparations for an election to take place from 1939 and by the end of this year, the following candidates had been selected; 
Liberal National: Leslie Burgin
Labour: F. L. Kerran

Elections in the 1950s

Elections in the 1960s

Elections in the 1970s

See also
List of former United Kingdom Parliament constituencies

References

Parliamentary constituencies in Bedfordshire (historic)
Constituencies of the Parliament of the United Kingdom established in 1885
Constituencies of the Parliament of the United Kingdom disestablished in 1974
Politics of Luton